Eleutherodactylus goini is a species of frog in the family Eleutherodactylidae endemic to Cuba.
Its natural habitats are subtropical or tropical moist lowland forest and rocky areas. It is threatened by habitat loss.

References

goini
Endemic fauna of Cuba
Amphibians of Cuba
Amphibians described in 1960
Taxonomy articles created by Polbot